Ghulam Ali Allana known as G. Allana (22 August 1906 – 8 March 1985) was a friend and biographer of Muhammad Ali Jinnah, the founder of Pakistan. Mr. Allana entered politics at an early age and played an active part in the Pakistan movement. After Partition, he was instrumental in forming the Federation of Pakistan Chambers of Commerce & Industry. He was a member of the West Pakistan Legislative Assembly, besides being the mayor of Karachi.
Internationally, Mr. Allana represented Pakistan at over 100 conferences, served on the governing body of the International Labour Organisation, and the president of the International Organisation of Employers, Brussels. At the United Nations he led a number of peace and diplomatic initiatives/working groups and went on to become chairman of the United Nations Commission on Human Rights in 1975. For his contributions he was awarded the United Nations peace medal and was also a nominee for the Nobel Peace Prize in 1977. He was also an English-language Pakistani poet and a counselor and friend to Fatima Jinnah, Muhammad Ali Jinnah's sister.

Early life and career
Ghulam Ali Allana was born in 1906 to an Ismaili Khoja family in Karachi, British India. He received his basic education at Sindh Madressatul Islam in Karachi. Then he attended St. Patrick's High School and D. J. Sindh Government Science College in Karachi.

G. Allana became active in politics at an early age and played an active role in the Pakistan Movement. After independence of Pakistan in 1947, he served as the second Mayor of Karachi after the partition (25 May 1948 – 8 July 1948). He served as founder President of the FPCCI until 1954.

Family
He married Jenubai in 1928 and had two daughters and a son with her.

Books
Quaid-e-Azam Jinnah: The story of a Nation, published in 1967 by Ferozsons, Lahore
Pakistan Movement: Historical Documents, published in 1977 by Islamic Book Service, Lahore
Our Freedom Fighters
His Highness Aga Khan III
I had Reached your Door Steps, a poem in English
The Lost Star, a poem in English

Awards and recognition
Peace Medal of the United Nations in 1977 by UN Secretary General Kurt Waldheim, awarded to him for his services on a global basis in the humanitarian field.
Human Rights Medal awarded in 1978 by the Human Rights Organization of Pakistan. 
To recognize his services to Pakistan, a road in Karachi was named, G. Allana Road, after him.

References

External links

1906 births
1985 deaths
Pakistani poets
Pakistani Ismailis
English-language poets
Pakistani civil servants
Mayors of Karachi
Pakistani people of Gujarati descent
St. Patrick's High School, Karachi alumni